I&R may refer to:

 Initiative & Referendum Institute (I&R Institute)
 Intelligence, surveillance, target acquisition, and reconnaissance (I&R Platoon)
 Inverness and Richmond Railway (I&R Railway)
 Imperial and Royal (I&R)

See also
 INR (disambiguation) 
 R&I (disambiguation)